The Tree's Knees is a 1931 one-reel short subject featuring Bosko, part of the Looney Tunes series. It was released in August 1931 and is directed by Hugh Harman and Rudolf Ising, the last cartoon in the series to be directed by the two. Every Looney Tunes cartoon after this was directed by Hugh Harman until 1933, and every Merrie Melodies cartoon was directed by Rudolf Ising until the aforementioned year. It is also the last Bosko cartoon to not feature the main character's (Bosko's) name in the title. The short is also notable for the extensive use of footage from the earlier short Ain't Nature Grand! that it reuses, in particular a scene of Bosko happily and innocently pursuing a butterfly.

The film score was composed by Frank Marsales.

Plot

Bosko wanders through the forest with an axe, and finds a tree, but the tree turns out to be alive and the surrounding saplings (presumably its children) beg Bosko not to chop it down. Bosko then engages in a song-and-dance routine with the trees, until he is distracted by and follows a butterfly, leading him into another song-and-dance routine with several other living trees and the animals of the forest.

References

External links
 
 

1931 films
1931 animated films
1930s American animated films
1930s animated short films
Fictional trees
Films scored by Frank Marsales
Films directed by Hugh Harman
Films directed by Rudolf Ising
Bosko films
Films set in forests
Looney Tunes shorts